Imaduddin School is one of the youngest schools in the Republic of Maldives.

School background

The Imaduddin School was inaugurated on 5 September 2001 by President Maumoon Abdul Gayoom.

The name Imaduddin refers to a sultan who ruled the Maldives during late 1800s. The school has almost 2000 students. Until 2009 the school taught students up to grade 7. After 2010 it also taught grades 8–10. It is the  first primary school in Maldives that also has secondary classes. The school also provides education for students with special needs.

Houses

External links
 Imaduddin School

Schools in the Maldives